Sir Thomas Isaac Birkin, 1st Baronet  (15 February 1831 – 16 January 1922) was a Nottingham lace manufacturer.

Early life
He was born on 15 February 1831, the second son of Richard Birkin (1805–1870), who founded the family lace-making business.

Career
After his father retired in 1856, his sons Richard Jr and Thomas took over, until Richard Jr retired in 1862, and Thomas was left in sole charge.

By 1898, the business had been split into two companies, Birkin and Co (fancy lace), and T. I. Birkin and Co (lace curtains), both headquartered at Broadway, Nottingham. They had expanded internationally, with large factories in Saxony and Chester, Pennsylvania, US.

Birkin was a magistrate, and a Deputy Lieutenant of Nottinghamshire, of which he was the High Sheriff in 1892. He was a director of the Great Northern Railway.

Personal life
He married Harriet Tebbutt (1835-1921), on 9 October 1856, and they had nine children:
 Sir Thomas Stanley Birkin, 2nd Baronet (1857–1931)
 Sir Alexander Russell Birkin, 4th Baronet (1861–1942)
 Lt-Col Richard Leslie Birkin (1863–1936)
 Harriet Maud Birkin (1864–1951)
 Colonel Charles Wilfred Birkin (1865–1932); married American Claire Lloyd Howe. One of their daughters was English socialite Freda Dudley Ward, who was the mistress of the Prince of Wales prior to his meeting Wallis Simpson.
 Hilda Mary Birkin (1868–1926)
 Major Philip Austen Birkin (1869–1951)
 Major Harry Laurence Birkin (1872–1951)
 Ethel Lillian Birkin (1874–1972)

He died on 16 January 1922, and is buried in the grade II listed Birkin Mausoleum, a small classical temple built in 1921 of Portland stone in Wilford Hill Cemetery, West Bridgford, Nottingham.

References

1831 births
1922 deaths
Baronets in the Baronetage of the United Kingdom
Thomas
High Sheriffs of Nottinghamshire
Deputy Lieutenants of Nottinghamshire
English justices of the peace